Statistics of Armenian Premier League in the 1998 season.
Aragats FC of Gyumri is promoted.

Regular season

League table

Results

Championship round

Championship round league table

Results

Relegation round

Relegation round league table

Results

Promotion/relegation play-off

Top goalscorers

See also
 1998 in Armenian football
 1998 Armenian First League
 1998 Armenian Cup

Armenian Premier League seasons
1
Armenia
Armenia